Andrew Carlson may refer to:

 Andy Carlson, American violinist
 Andrew Carlson (politician) (born 1974/75), member of the Minnesota House of Representatives
 Andrew Carlson (tennis) (born 1977), American tennis player